Thomas Dähne (born 4 January 1994) is a German professional footballer who plays as a goalkeeper for Holstein Kiel.

Club career
Dähne joined the youth set-up of Red Bull Salzburg from TSV 1860 Rosenheim, and he advanced through the club's youth system, making his debut for the second team as a stand in for first-choice goalkeeper Niclas Heimann in a 5–0 win against TSV St. Johann in Regional League West on 29 April 2010. Dähne established himself in the first team of FC Liefering—Red Bull's feeder team—during the 2012–13 season, which he finished by making his Austrian Football Bundesliga debut for Red Bull Salzburg in a 3–0 win against Austria Wien on 26 May 2013.

On 10 August 2015, Dähne joined HJK for the remainder of the season. In October of the same year, HJK asserted their option of keeping him under contract for the 2016 season.

On 23 November 2017, he signed a 2.5-year deal with Wisła Płock.

International career
Dähne has represented Germany at every level up to under-20, and he was a member of the German squad at the 2011 FIFA U-17 World Cup.

Honors
Regionalliga West (3rd league): 2012-13
Austrian League:  2013–14
Austrian Cup:  2013–14
Veikkausliiga: 2016–17
Finnish League Cup: 2016–17

References

External links
 

1994 births
Living people
People from Rosenheim (district)
Sportspeople from Upper Bavaria
Footballers from Bavaria
Association football goalkeepers
German footballers
Germany youth international footballers
Austrian Football Bundesliga players
Regionalliga players
Veikkausliiga players
Ekstraklasa players
FC Red Bull Salzburg players
FC Liefering players
RB Leipzig players
RB Leipzig II players
Helsingin Jalkapalloklubi players
Wisła Płock players
Holstein Kiel players
German expatriate footballers
Expatriate footballers in Finland
Expatriate footballers in Poland